Tu volverás is a soap opera produced by Telemundo Studios Miami and released in Singapore. The series starred Laura Chimaras, Gaby Espino, Carlos Ferro, and Gabriel Coronel.

Synopsis
Natalia, Diego, Sofia, and three brothers who suffer the hatred of their family and must leave home after their parents murder. They must rebuild their lives under new assumed identities in the countryside. Twelve years later, the sisters are willing to confess everything to get some money. They get along with the children of the billionaire owner of the biggest cosmetic industry in the United States and must confront their parents’ murderer. Major themes include romance, the errors of life, forgetting hatred, and loving those who love duty.

Cast
 Laura Chimaras -  Daniela Cruz / Natalia Cruz 
 Gaby Espino -  Gabriela Cruz Kings / Kings Cross Sofia 
 Carlos Ferro -  Juan Andres Sanchez 
 Gabriel Coronel -  Santiago Sánchez 
 Daniela Navarro -  Violet Fuenmayor 
 Marlene Favela -  Clara Sanchez 
 Jorge Luis Pila -  Julian Reyes
 Jonathan Freudman -  Alejandro Galvez 
 Dad Dager -  Fernanda Alonso 
 Mercedes Molto -  Mercy Cross 
 Jeannette Lehr -  Teresa Baura 
 José Guillermo Cortines -  Cesar Andrade 
 Desideria D'Caro -  Isabel Reyes
 Alex Hernandez -  Leonardo Portillo 
 Saul Lisazo -  Horacio Sanchez 
 Maritza Bustamante -  Marianela Silva 
 Beatriz Valdés -  Patricia Rogers Galvez / Poppy Valdivia 
 Kevin Aponte -  Maximiliano Alonso / Alonso Edward Rogers 
 Ana Carolina Grajales -  Veronica "Vero" Silva 
 Roberto Mateos -  Fernando Vidal 
 Ana Layevska -  Barbara Torres
 Leonardo Daniel -  Ricardo Guzman 
 Cynthia Olavarria -  Miranda Sandoval 
 Martha Picanes -  Rosalinda Sanchez Vilanova 
 Gabriel Correa -  Anthony "Tony" Sanchez 
 Anastasia Mazzone -  Elizabeth Alarcon 
 David Chocarro -  Ignacio Galvez 
 Wanda D'Isidoro -  Lorena Sanchez 
 Jonathan Islas -  Alberto Nova 
 Bernie Paz -  Ernesto Sanchez 
 Omar Granado -  Vicente Chavez 
 Maritza Rodríguez -  Francisca Avila 
 Oscar Gonzalez -  Ludovico Fernandez 
 Simon Roman -  Gregorio Saez 
 Alejandra Vaisman -  Alicia Santos
 Carolina Tejera -  Vanessa Rogers
 Ana Lorena Sanchez -  Kimberly Soler 
 Roberto Manrique -  Alexander Aragón 
 Rosario Delgado -  Guadalupe Ferrreti 
 Dalila Colombo -  Dóris Cervantes de Aragón 
 Alfredo Guerra -  Noel Cruz 
 Annabela Blum -  Liliana Distem 
 Juliana Divaste -  Britney 
 Luis José Almenta -  Roman 
 Jonathan Quintana -  Bryan Aragon 
 Fabiola Colmenares -  Thalia

External links 
 http://www.el-nacional.com/escenas/venezolana-proxima-protagonista-Telemundo_0_688131337.html
 http://www.2001.com.ve/en-el-chisme/107755/la-chimaras-sera-la-proxima-estrella-de-telemundo.html

Telemundo telenovelas
2015 American television series debuts